Siu Lun is an MTR Light Rail stop located at ground level at Tuen Mun Heung Sze Wui Road between Siu Lun Court and Tsui Ning Garden in Tuen Mun District. It began service on 17 November 1991 and belongs to Zone 1. It serves Siu Lun Court and Tsui Ning Garden.

References

Website of Map
http://www.mtr.com.hk/archive/en/services/maps/lrt_02.pdf

MTR Light Rail stops
Former Kowloon–Canton Railway stations
Tuen Mun District
Railway stations in Hong Kong opened in 1991
1991 establishments in Hong Kong
MTR Light Rail stops named from housing estates